John Wick is an American action thriller media franchise created by Derek Kolstad and centered around John Wick, a former hitman who is forced back into the criminal underworld he had previously abandoned.

The franchise began with the release of John Wick in 2014, followed by two sequels, John Wick: Chapter 2 in 2017 and John Wick: Chapter 3 – Parabellum in 2019. The three films were considered critical and commercial successes, with a collective gross of more than $587 million worldwide. A fourth installment, John Wick: Chapter 4, is in post-production and has a release date of March 24, 2023. Two spin-offs are in development for a 2023 release: the limited series The Continental, and film Ballerina, while a fifth main installment, originally intended to be shot back-to-back with the fourth film, is also in development.

Background

John Wick (Keanu Reeves) was born Jardani Jovonovich in Belarus. He was an orphan, and was taken in by the Ruska Roma crime syndicate where he was raised as an assassin, eventually rising to become the top enforcer of the Russian Mafia known as "Baba Yaga" ("the one you sent to kill [the] Boogeyman"), under crime boss Viggo Tarasov (Michael Nyqvist), who deemed him so ruthless so-as to respect and fear him. At the beginning of the first film, Wick had been retired from being a hitman for five years, after undertaking an "impossible task" for Tarasov, wiping out all other organised crime syndicates in New York City in order to be allowed to leave to marry Helen (Bridget Moynahan) before her eventual death from cancer, leaving him known as a legend in the assassin underworld world-wide.

Every assassin in the world sticks to a strict code for conducting "business", revolving around the Continental hotel chain, which serves as neutral ground for the underworld, on-where all properties, all "business" is strictly forbidden, with each manager — including Winston Scott	(Ian McShane), Sofia Al-Azwar (Halle Berry), and Shimazu Koji (Hiroyuki Sanada) — swearing their fealty to the High Table, a council of twelve high-level leaders of world society, while paying for services within the underworld with specialised gold coins, used as both fiscal and ethical currency to acquire goods and services, as well as honor-bound favors — a specific variety of which, a "marker", binds one's soul to an unbreakable blood oath between two individuals, in exchange for a specific task undertaken by each party for the other, for which one serves as the "bearer" until one day on-which they intend to claim the favor owed. Every assassin is bound to stick by two rules, lest they be made "excommunicado" — 1. No business is to be conducted on Continental grounds. 2. Every marker must be honored.

Films

Released

John Wick (2014)

The first film in the series focuses on Wick's search for the men who broke into his home, stole his beloved vintage car, and killed his puppy, Daisy. She was the final gift from his recently deceased wife, Helen (Bridget Moynahan).

The films began development in 2012. Principal photography began September 25, 2013, and wrapped on December 20, 2013.

John Wick: Chapter 2 (2017)

Forced to honor a debt from his past life, Wick is sent to assassinate a target he has no wish to kill, then faces betrayal at the hands of his sponsor.

Principal photography began on October 26, 2015. The film premiered in February 2017.

John Wick: Chapter 3 – Parabellum (2019)

John Wick is on the run, being hunted with a $14 million 'open' contract on his life for breaking a foundational rule: taking a life on Continental Hotel grounds. The victim, Santino D'Antonio (Riccardo Scamarcio) was a member of the High Table, the organization that ordered the open contract. John should have already been executed, but the Continental's manager, Winston Scott (Ian McShane), has given him a one-hour grace period before he is excommunicado—his membership will be revoked and he will be banned from all services and cut off from other members. John uses favors and contacts accrued in his former life to stay alive as he fights his way out of New York City.

The third film was announced in October 2016, production began in early 2018 and was released in May 2019.

Future films

John Wick: Chapter 4 (2023)

In May 2019, prior to the release of John Wick: Chapter 3 – Parabellum, Chad Stahelski confirmed on a Reddit "Ask Me Anything" thread that there has been discussion of another film. Keanu Reeves has also stated that he would continue as long as the films are successful. Lionsgate officially announced the film during John Wick 3s opening week, with a scheduled release date of May 21, 2021. However, in April 2020, during an interview with Collider, Stahelski revealed that the film would most likely not make its 2021 release date due to his commitment to The Matrix Resurrections. He also revealed, during the same interview, that a 100-page "scriptment" (part script/part outline) had been written for the film. The screenplay was written by Shay Hatten and Michael Finch, as the studio decided to move on from series creator Derek Kolstad. Production is due to commence in June 2021 in Paris and Berlin, with additional filming in Japan and New York City. Partly due to the COVID-19 pandemic, the film is now scheduled for release on March 24, 2023. In June 2021, Donnie Yen, Rina Sawayama, Shamier Anderson, Bill Skarsgård  and Hiroyuki Sanada joined the cast. Principal photography began on June 28, 2021. In October 2021, principal photography had officially wrapped.

Ballerina (TBA)

In July 2017, Lionsgate announced the development of a spin-off film written by Shay Hatten and titled Ballerina. The studio intends to expand the franchise with installments set within the same fictional world. The story, written as a spec script based on Hatten's love for the John Wick films before being purchased by Lionsgate, involves a young woman who is raised to be an assassin who seeks revenge on the hitmen who killed her family. Basil Iwanyk and Erica Lee will serve as producers. The project will be developed by Thunder Road Films production studio.

In October 2019, Len Wiseman signed onto the project as director, with Keanu Reeves and Chad Stahelski serving as a producer and executive producer, respectively. The film will follow the same ballerina character previously portrayed by Unity Phelan in John Wick: Chapter 3 – Parabellum. In May 2020, Stahelski stated that Wiseman had read the script earlier, and approached the studio with a pitch of how he would develop the project, based on Hatten's draft, for which the proof of concept had previously been uploaded to YouTube in September 2017. Stahelski met with Wiseman, and approached executives to hire the filmmaker. He confirmed that he and his team will work closely with Wiseman on the action sequences and stunts for the film, while acknowledging that Wiseman's filmmaking style will add variety to the franchise. At that point, Wiseman and Hatten were working on a newer draft of the script. In May 2020, it was reported that the studio is looking for an actress, with Chloë Grace Moretz as the template for the kind of talent they are looking for. In October 2021, Ana de Armas entered early-negotiations to portray the titular character. By April 2022 at CinemaCon, Lionsgate officially announced that de Armas will star in the lead role. Principal photography will commence later that summer. In July of the same year, it was revealed that de Armas had personally selected Emerald Fennell to contribute to the script as one of its writers.

In September 2022, it was announced that principal photography had been delayed from its previous tentative start and will commence later that fall. In November 2022, principal photography was scheduled to begin imminently. Later that month, Ian McShane and Keanu Reeves were announced as part of the cast, reprising their respective roles as Winston Scott and John Wick. Filming began on November 7, 2022, in Prague, Czech Republic.

John Wick: Chapter 5 (TBA)
In August 2020, Lionsgate CEO Jon Feltheimer confirmed that a fifth film was also being developed. It was intended to be shot back-to-back with the fourth installment in early 2021, but in March 2021, Lionsgate opted to delay production and move forward with Chapter 4 first. In May 2022, Stehelski stated that while Chapter 4 has some "conclusion" elements to the story, there would be a fifth installment to the franchise.

Other films in development

Sophia
In February 2022, Halle Berry spoke to IGN about the possibility of her character having a spin-off film, evolving from a failed concept for a film about her James Bond character, Jinx.

Nobody crossover
In March 2021, Derek Kolstad stated that there is potential for a crossover between John Wick and Nobody, while it would be done in a small, Easter egg-reference manner. Later that month, director Ilya Naishuller stated that there is potential for crossover with the John Wick franchise, noting that the same creative teams and studios made the films. In June of the same year, Kolstad stated that he would like to have the properties crossover in a minimalist fashion, but reaffirmed that John Wick and Hutch Mansell would be on the same side should the characters share more screen time.

Television

The Continental

In June 2017, Chad Stahelski and Derek Kolstad were announced to be developing a television series for Lionsgate based on the characters and setting of the John Wick films, tentatively titled The Continental. The series was reported to center around the hotel safe-haven for hit men and assassins, which features in the films. It was reported that Reeves would reprise his role. That same month, it was announced that the series would be a prequel to the film series that takes place years prior to the events of the films.

In April 2021, chairman of Lionsgate Television Kevin Beggs announced that the series will center around a young Winston in the 1970s. The series will explore real-world events, including the Great Garbage Strike and the American Mafia's rise to economic power. He announced that the project's plot had been difficult to develop, with the studio having taken various pitches from different creative teams, before the creators of Wayne presented the concept that they settled upon: three 90-minute episodes, making The Continental a limited series. In October 2021, it was announced that Mel Gibson would star in the series, with Colin Woodell cast as a young Winston Scott. Hubert Point-Du Jour, Jessica Allain, Mishel Prada, Nhung Kate, and Ben Robson were also added to the cast. In November 2021, Ayomide Adegun, Peter Greene, and Jeremy Bobb joined the cast as a young Charon, a younger Uncle Charlie, and a new character named Mayhew, respectively. In February 2022, it was announced that Katie McGrath was cast as The Adjudicator.

In August 2022, Lionsgate announced it had sold premiere rights to the series to Peacock, having determined the series was no longer a fit for Starz. It is now expected to premiere in 2023.

Cast and characters

Production

Development
The premise for John Wick was conceived by screenwriter Derek Kolstad who began work on a treatment about a retired contract killer coming out to seek vengeance, entitled Scorn. After one month of work, he had completed the first draft of the screenplay. After addressing several issues he pitched the script to various clients, garnering at least three offers. When he first began to think about writing the script, Kolstad was influenced by film-noir classics, and the themes of revenge and the antihero. Kolstad explained that he tried to, "explore what would happen if the worst man in existence found salvation [... and] when the source of his salvation is ripped from him, what happens? Do the gates of Hades open?"

In December 2012, Thunder Road Pictures had bought the script with discretionary funds, with Kolstad agreeing to Thunder Road's plan to make the film straight away. When Basil Iwanyk, head of Thunder Road Pictures, had first read Kolstad's original screenplay, he was immediately drawn to the main character of Wick, stating: "The tone of the script was subversive and really fun". He also admired the emotional weight and action elements of the piece. After Thunder Road had optioned the script, Kolstad spent additional months rewriting the script with them. In the original script, the character of John Wick was written with "a man in his mid-sixties" to play the role, given the title character's fabled reputation as a revered and respected assassin. However, Iwanyk believed that this was irrelevant and bent the original vision ever so slightly, stating: "Instead, we decided to look for someone who is not literally older, but who has a seasoned history in the film world".

In 2013, Keanu Reeves secured the film's male lead. After Iwanyk and Peter Lawson of Thunder Road showed him the script, he thought it to be full of potential and stated: "I love the role but you want the whole story, the whole ensemble to come to life". Reeves and Kolstad worked closely together on further developing the screenplay and the story, with the screenwriter describing: "We spent as much time developing the other characters as we did his. [Keanu] recognizes that the strength of the storyline lies in even the smallest details". The title of the film was later changed from Scorn to John Wick, as according to Kolstad, "Keanu liked the name so much, that Reeves kept telling everyone that he was making a film called 'John Wick, and the producers agreed, changing the title.

During story discussions for John Wick, Reeves contacted Chad Stahelski and David Leitch, whom he originally met on the set of The Matrix, to see if they were interested in choreographing or directing the action of the piece. Reeves admired Stahelski and Leitch's work performing, choreographing and coordinating, stating that, "when I got the script...I immediately thought of Chad and Dave for the action design, but I was secretly hoping they'd want to direct it". He later added: "I knew that they would love the genre and I knew that they would love John Wick. And I thought the worlds that get created – the real world and then this underworld – would be attractive to them, and it was". After reading Kolstad's script, Stahelski and Leitch told Reeves they wanted to tell the story of John Wick, as they both had a desire to get involved with a project as directors. Impressed with Reeves' enthusiasm and the quality of the script, Stahelski and Leitch told him that they wished to direct the film and later presented him with their version of the story which was based on "[...] the idea of [Wick] as an urban legend, a thriller assassin movie with a realistic vibe and an otherworldly setting". Impressed with their concept, Reeves supported the pair, and Stahelski and Leitch pitched the idea to the studio, who hired them to direct, contrary to their initial request of directing the film's second unit. In May 2013, Stahelski and Leitch came to direct the film together as a team, though it was later ruled by the Directors Guild of America that only Stahelski would be given the director credit. Leitch was credited as a producer.

Principal photography for the first film began in New York City, with an original shooting schedule from September 25 to December 5, 2013, and the filming process scheduled to continue in and around New York City and the greater New York area.

In February 2015, directors Stahelski and Leitch stated that a John Wick sequel had begun development, which was later titled John Wick: Chapter 2. The same month, Lionsgate CEO Jon Feltheimer stated during a conference call that they see John Wick as a multiple-title action franchise. Additionally, it was reported that Kolstad would return to write the screenplay. In May 2015, it was confirmed that a sequel was green-lit, and Lionsgate would be selling the film at the Cannes Film Festival. Principal photography on the film began on October 26, 2015, in New York City. It would later move to Rome, and eventually resume in Montreal, Canada on October 27, 2016.

In October 2016, Stahelski stated a third film was in development. In June 2017, it was reported that Kolstad would return again to write the screenplay for the third film. In September 2017, Lionsgate announced a release date of May 17, 2019. In January 2018, it was reported that Chad Stahelski was returning to direct the film and Common, Laurence Fishburne, and Ruby Rose were set to reprise their roles from the second film. Additionally, it was announced that Hiroyuki Sanada had been cast as the film's antagonist. The film began production in early 2018. On May 21, 2018, it was reported that Halle Berry, Asia Kate Dillon, Anjelica Huston, Mark Dacascos and Jason Mantzoukas had joined the cast.

Inspiration for the film series 
Director Chad Stahelski cited The Good, the Bad and the Ugly (1966), Point Blank (1967), Le Cercle Rouge (1970), and The Killer (1989) as influences for the series.

About The Good, the Bad and the Ugly, Stahelski said, "Look at Clint Eastwood in [the film] – there is so much back-story unsaid there. We're big fans of leaving it to your imagination. We just give you some gold coins, and then it's, 'Where do the gold coins come from?' We'll get to that eventually. Have your imagination do some work there." He also said Point Blank influenced John Wick: "One of the biggest inspirations for the film was Point Blank. We watched it on a loop in our office, and there are a couple of homages to that [in John Wick]." Park Chan-wook's The Vengeance Trilogy (2002–2005) and Lee Jeong-beom's The Man from Nowhere (2010) influenced the film due to "[their] minimalist composition and graphic nature."

Alistair MacLean and Stephen King were huge influences in the creation of the story of John Wick in terms of characterization and world-building, with screenwriter Derek Kolstad stating, "MacLean could build a world, and King could surprise you by what the main character truly was capable of." Outside of films, Stahelski and Leitch drew inspiration from the visual stylings of the '60s and '70s as well as cinematic influences, including Sergio Leone, Akira Kurosawa, Steve McQueen, Lee Marvin, William Friedkin and Sam Peckinpah. Stahelski himself said, "All the way back to Kurosawa up to Sergio Leone. We like the Spaghetti Western sensibility there, some of the composition." About inspiration and emulation from the noir film genre, Stahelski added that "Noir maybe was sort of less impact for us than the other sort of westerns and Kurosawa and things like that. I think we wanted to make this hard-boiled character."

Reception

Box office performance

Critical and public response

Other media

Video games 
Wick appears as a playable character in Payday 2. John Wick-themed elements were also added to Fortnite Battle Royale upon the launch of its ninth season, occurring a day before the third film's release. A Wick-inspired character had previously been available in the game's third season.

John Wick Chronicles, a virtual reality game game set in the Continental Hotel, was released on February 9, 2017. Players assassinate multiple targets inside the hotel as John Wick using a multitude of weapons.

John Wick Hex, a tactical role-playing game, was announced in May 2019 and released on October 8, 2019. The game has the player control Wick in various missions to use his array of skills to take down opponents and features the voices of Ian McShane and Lance Reddick reprising their film roles, among others. The PlayStation 4 version of the game was released on May 5, 2020.

Lionsgate has also revealed that they have received several pitches for a AAA John Wick''' title but are still currently fielding those proposal.

 Comic books 

A John Wick comic book mini-series was released between November 29, 2017 and January 31, 2018 by Dynamite Entertainment. It was written by Greg Pak and illustrated by Giovanni Valletta (issues 1 and 2) and Matt Gaudio (issues 3–5). The five-book series chronicles a young John Wick after his release from prison and his first vendetta. It serves as a prequel to the movie franchise and introduces the Book of Rules, The Continental and other aspects familiar within the John Wick movie series.

 The Simpsons 

On May 23, 2021, thirty-second season finale of The Simpsons, titled "The Last Barfighter", aired on Fox as an official parody of John Wick: Chapter 2 and John Wick: Chapter 3 – Parabellum'', featuring Ian McShane guest star as Artemis Scott, Winston's twin brother and the manager of "The Confidential" hotel, part of a secret society of bartenders of which members include Moe Szyslak and Dr. Julius Hibbert.

Notes

References 

Mass media franchises introduced in 2014
Film series introduced in 2014
Action film franchises
Thriller film series
Lionsgate franchises
 
Wick, John